Understanding is an album by American organist John Patton recorded in 1968 and released on the Blue Note label.

Reception

The AllMusic review by Scott Yanow awarded the album 2 stars and stated "the endless repetitions on these rather simplistic originals may drive alert listeners batty after a while."

Track listing
All compositions by John Patton except where noted
 "Congo Chant" - 9:05
 "Alfie's Theme" (Sonny Rollins) - 4:40
 "Soul Man" (Isaac Hayes, David Porter) - 6:13
 "Understanding" (Sam Gary, Mark Nash) - 6:52
 "Chitlins con Carne" (Kenny Burrell) - 6:30
Recorded at Rudy Van Gelder Studio, Englewood Cliffs, New Jersey on October 25, 1968.

Personnel
Big John Patton - organ
Harold Alexander - tenor saxophone, flute
Hugh Walker - drums

References

Blue Note Records albums
John Patton (musician) albums
1968 albums
Albums recorded at Van Gelder Studio
Albums produced by Francis Wolff